Saulo Torón Navarro (June 28, 1885 – January 23, 1974) was a Spanish poet.

1885 births
1974 deaths
Spanish male poets
20th-century Spanish poets
20th-century Spanish male writers